Addison Powell (February 23, 1921 – November 8, 2010) was an American actor whose numerous television, stage and film credits included Dark Shadows, The Thomas Crown Affair and Three Days of the Condor.  He was best known for playing Dr. Eric Lang, a mad scientist who created Adam, on Dark Shadows.

Early life
Powell was born in 1921 in Belmont, Massachusetts. His parents, Edward Henry and Kathrene (née Barnum) Powell, were school teachers. Powell received a bachelor's degree from Boston University. He enlisted in the U.S. Army Air Force as a navigator during World War II. Powell ultimately flew more than 30 combat missions as a navigator on board B-17 bombers from their base in East Anglia, the United Kingdom. He earned a second degree from the Yale School of Drama (class of 1948) following the end of the war.

Career
Powell's film credits included The Mating Game (1959) with Debbie Reynolds, In the French Style (1963) with Jean Seberg, and The Thomas Crown Affair (1968), the latter in which he played Abe, a bank robber, opposite Steve McQueen. In 1975, Powell appeared in The Reincarnation of Peter Proud with Michael Sarrazin, and played a rogue CIA officer in Three Days of the Condor, which starred Robert Redford. He portrayed Admiral Chester W. Nimitz in the 1977 biopic, MacArthur, which starred Gregory Peck, and later appeared in the 1987 murder mystery film The Rosary Murders, opposite Donald Sutherland and Charles Durning.

His television credits included roles in the first seasons of both Law & Order and The Mod Squad. Powell also had a recurring role as Dr. Eric Lang in the television series, Dark Shadows, which aired on ABC from 1966 until 1971. He guest-starred in an episode of Gibbsville in 1976 and co-starred as a detective in the 1977 television film, Contract on Cherry Street, with Frank Sinatra and Martin Balsam. In 1988 he appeared as Admiral Harold Stark in the miniseries War and Remembrance, opposite Robert Mitchum. He also portrayed the Gorton's Fisherman in Gorton's Fish Commercials in 1982.

Personal life
In 1950, Powell married Bunnie Rowley. The couple had three children: Mary, Julie and Michael and resided on the Upper West Side of Manhattan. They remained married until Rowley’s death in 1995.

Death
Addison Powell died on November 8, 2010, at 89 years old. Powell had resided in Vermont for twenty-two years, most recently at the Shelburne Bay Senior Living community in Shelburne.

Filmography

References

External links

Film Reference: Addison Powell Biography

1921 births
2010 deaths
Male actors from Boston
United States Army Air Forces personnel of World War II
American male television actors
American male film actors
American male stage actors
Boston University alumni
Yale School of Drama alumni
People from Chittenden County, Vermont
People from Belmont, Massachusetts
United States Army Air Forces officers
Military personnel from Massachusetts
20th-century American male actors